Cuzzetto is an Italian surname. Notable people with the surname include:

 Joe Cuzzetto (born 1960), Canadian soccer player
 Rudy Cuzzetto, Canadian politician in Ontario

Italian-language surnames